Kvidinge IF is a Swedish football club located in Kvidinge situated in Åstorp Municipality, Skåne County.

Background
Kvidinge Idrottsförening were formed on 13 June 1913 and from their inception to well into the 1930s specialised in athletics. Football was played only sporadically and it was not until 1931 that the club for the first time participated in a league.

Since their formation Kvidinge IF football club has participated in the middle and lower divisions of the Swedish football league system. The club's first major football success was 1941–42 when the club won Skåneserien Division 2. It took until 1962 before any further success when they won the Skåneserien Division 6, a feat that was repeated again in 1967. In 1972 Kvidinge IF won the Division 5 and gained promotion to Division 4 Skåne Nordvästra. The most successful period in the club's history followed reaching its peak in the 1980s when KIF played two seasons in Division 3 Sydvästra Götaland, then the third tier of Swedish football, in 1980 and 1986.

The club currently plays in Division 7 Skåne Nordvästra which is the ninth tier of Swedish football. They play their home matches at the Kvidinge IP in Kvidinge.

Kvidinge IF are affiliated to the Skånes Fotbollförbund.

Season to season

In their successful period in the 1970s and 1980s Kvidinge IF competed in the following divisions:

In recent seasons Kvidinge IF have competed in the following divisions:

Attendances
KIF's record attendance at Kvidinge idrottsplats was in 1977 when 4,610 people attended the home match with Malmö FF in the Svenska Cupen.

Footnotes

External links
 Kvidinge IF – Official website
  Kvidinge IF Facebook

Sport in Skåne County
Football clubs in Skåne County
Sports clubs established in 1913
Association football clubs established in 1931
1931 establishments in Sweden